Berzano may refer to:

Places
Berzano di San Pietro, comune in the Province of Asti
Berzano di Tortona, comune in the Province of Alessandria

People
Luigi Berzano (born 1939), Italian sociologist and Catholic priest

Italian-language surnames